Kreshnik Nick Qato (born 13 August 1978) is an Albanian former professional boxer who competed from 2001 to 2014. He held multiple regional titles at super-middleweight, including the WBA Inter-Continental title in 2004 and the European External title in 2007, and also held minor world titles at middleweight; the WBFo title in 2008 and the WBF title from 2009 to 2010.

Professional boxing record

| style="text-align:center;" colspan="8"|30 Wins (5 knockouts, 25 decisions),  9 Losses (3 knockouts, 6 decisions), 0 Draws
|-  style="text-align:center; background:#e3e3e3;"
|  style="border-style:none none solid solid; "|Res.
|  style="border-style:none none solid solid; "|Record
|  style="border-style:none none solid solid; "|Opponent
|  style="border-style:none none solid solid; "|Type
|  style="border-style:none none solid solid; "|Rd., Time
|  style="border-style:none none solid solid; "|Date
|  style="border-style:none none solid solid; "|Location
|  style="border-style:none none solid solid; "|Notes
|- align=center
|Loss
|align=center|30-9||align=left| Jason Ball
|
|
|
|align=left|
|- align=center
|Win
|align=center|30-8||align=left| Atilla Kiss
|
|
|
|align=left|
|align=left|
|- align=center
|- align=center
|- align=center
|Win
|align=center|29-8||align=left| Max Maxwell
|
|
|
|align=left|
|align=left|
|- align=center
|- align=center
|Win
|align=center|28-8||align=left| Matt Hainy
|
|
|
|align=left|
|align=left|
|- align=center
|Win
|align=center|27-8||align=left| Ruslans Pojonisevs
|
|
|
|align=left|
|align=left|
|- align=center
|Win
|align=center|26-8||align=left| Terry Carruthers
|
|
|
|align=left|
|align=left|
|- align=center
|Loss
|align=center|25-8||align=left| Gary Boulden
|
|
|
|align=left|
|align=left|
|- align=center
|Win
|align=center|25-7||align=left| Steffan Hughes
|
|
|
|align=left|
|align=left|
|- align=center
|Loss
|align=center|24-7||align=left| Karama Nyilawila
|
|
|
|align=left|
|align=left|
|- align=center
|Win
|align=center|24-6||align=left| Matt Scriven
|
|
|
|align=left|
|align=left|
|- align=center
|Win
|align=center|23-6||align=left| Esteban Waldemar Ponce
|
|
|
|align=left|
|align=left|
|- align=center
|Win
|align=center|22-6||align=left| Alex Spitko
|
|
|
|align=left|
|align=left|
|- align=center
|Win
|align=center|21-6||align=left| Fabio Liggieri
|
|
|
|align=left|
|align=left|
|- align=center
|Win
|align=center|20-6||align=left| Zoltan Surman
|
|
|
|align=left|
|align=left|
|- align=center
|Win
|align=center|19-6||align=left| Jurijs Boreiko
|
|
|
|align=left|
|align=left|
|- align=center
|Win
|align=center|18-6||align=left| David Estrada
|
|
|
|align=left|
|align=left|
|- align=center
|Win
|align=center|17-6||align=left| Vitor Sa
|
|
|
|align=left|
|align=left|
|- align=center
|Win
|align=center|16-6||align=left| Ernie Smith
|
|
|
|align=left|
|align=left|
|- align=center
|Win
|align=center|15-6||align=left| Alexander Zaitsev
|
|
|
|align=left|
|align=left|
|- align=center
|Win
|align=center|14-6||align=left| Simeon Cover
|
|
|
|align=left|
|align=left|
|- align=center
|Win
|align=center|13-6||align=left| Simeon Cover
|
|
|
|align=left|
|align=left|
|- align=center
|Win
|align=center|12-6||align=left| Sylvain Touzet
|
|
|
|align=left|
|align=left|
|- align=center
|Win
|align=center|11-6||align=left| Simone Lucas
|
|
|
|align=left|
|align=left|
|- align=center
|Win
|align=center|10-6||align=left| Laurent Goury
|
|
|
|align=left|
|align=left|
|- align=center
|Win
|align=center|9-6||align=left| Daniil Prakaptsou
|
|
|
|align=left|
|align=left|
|- align=center
|Win
|align=center|8-6||align=left| Dmitry Donetsky
|
|
|
|align=left|
|align=left|
|- align=center
|Win
|align=center|7-6||align=left| Rizvan Magomedov
|
|
|
|align=left|
|align=left|
|- align=center
|Win
|align=center|6-6||align=left| Vladimir Zavgorodniy
|
|
|
|align=left|
|align=left|
|- align=center
|Loss
|align=center|5-6||align=left| Gary Lockett
|
|
|
|align=left|
|align=left|
|- align=center
|Loss
|align=center|5-5||align=left| Steven Bendall
|
|
|
|align=left|
|align=left|
|- align=center
|Win
|align=center|5-4||align=left| Joel Ani
|
|
|
|align=left|
|align=left|
|- align=center
|Loss
|align=center|4-4||align=left| Scott Dann
|
|
|
|align=left|
|align=left|
|- align=center
|Win
|align=center|4-3||align=left| Danny Thornton
|
|
|
|align=left|
|align=left|
|- align=center
|Win
|align=center|3-3||align=left| Mark Thornton
|
|
|
|align=left|
|align=left|
|- align=center
|Win
|align=center|2-3||align=left| Jason Collins
|
|
|
|align=left|
|align=left|
|- align=center
|Loss
|align=center|1-3||align=left| Paul Jones
|
|
|
|align=left|
|align=left|
|- align=center
|Win
|align=center|1-2||align=left| Ty Browne
|
|
|
|align=left|
|align=left|
|- align=center
|Loss
|align=center|0-2||align=left| Lawrence Murphy
|
|
|
|align=left|
|align=left|
|- align=center
|Loss
|align=center|0-1||align=left| Eric Teymour
|
|
|
|align=left|
|align=left|
|- align=center

References

External links
Interview in the Gazeta Shqiptare
Kreshnik Qato at BoxRec.com

1978 births
Living people
Sportspeople from Durrës
Albanian male boxers
Middleweight boxers